The Mask: Animated Series is an American animated television series based on the 1994 film of the same title. The series ran for a total of three seasons and fifty-four episodes from August 12, 1995, to August 30, 1997. It spawned its own short-run comic book series, Adventures of The Mask. John Arcudi, former writer of the original comics, wrote two episodes of the series.

The Mask was one of three animated series based on Jim Carrey movies that premiered the same year. These included the 1995–2000 Ace Ventura: Pet Detective series, and the 1995–1996 Dumb and Dumber series.

Overview
The series retained major plot points from the film, with insecure bank clerk Stanley Ipkiss using an ancient mask to gain superpowers while taking on the mischievous and cartoonish, but heroic and good-hearted personality of The Mask. The major alteration is that Stanley can use the mask in daytime as well as at night. Following the events of the film, Stanley's friend and coworker Charlie thinks that Stanley threw the mask away, but Stanley either discovers that his dog Milo retrieved it, or pretended to get rid of it and decided to keep it.

Reporter Peggy Brandt is the main female character in the series, though Stanley is upset with her for selling him out to the mob. Tina Carlyle (Cameron Diaz's character in the film) is absent from the series and is never mentioned. Niko and Dorian Tyrell, the two primary antagonists of the 1994 film who died during the course of it, do not appear in the animated series and are never even mentioned (though Peggy does make a mention of the mob in the pilot). Dr. Arthur Neuman (voiced by Ben Stein) once again appears in three episodes in this series, even ending up wearing the mask in one episode. Charlie is made to be the one in charge of the bank instead of a simple employee, Mr. Dickey is never mentioned at all. Mayor Mitchel Tilton is replaced with Mayor Mortimer Tilton (who looks nothing like Ivory Ocean) and is a corrupt politician who loves promoting himself.

Despite having a "realistic" setting in the fictional town of Edge City, the series often relies more on Tex Avery-style humor and occasionally breaks any meaningful laws of reality. For example, one episode featured the Goofalotatots, parodies of the Animaniacs, treating them as if they were naturally alive. Another featured the Mask becoming a personal assistant to the President of the United States, with the job merely handed to him (former Mask comic writer John Arcudi wrote both example episodes, a stark departure from his usual writing). Police officers are portrayed as idiots unable to recognize obvious clues.

Also continued from the film were The Mask's frequent visits to the Coco Bongo: a fictional, glamorous nightclub frequented by the Edge City well-to-do, which was based on the Copacabana in New York City. The destruction of the Coco Bongo in the episode "A Comedy of Eras" horrifies and enrages The Mask, and provides him with the motivation to ultimately defeat the antagonist.

During the late 1990s, Rob Paulsen appeared on the US TV talk show Donny & Marie. When talking about his role as Stanley Ipkiss/The Mask, Paulsen said, "I get to be Jim Carrey for a whole lot less cake."

Characters

Main characters
 Stanley Ipkiss/The Mask (voiced by Rob Paulsen) - A bank account businessman and the main owner and wearer of the mask. Stanley is meek, yet kind and polite, but is treated as a doormat by people who take advantage of him. The Mask is a superhero who is childishly immature, wild, confident and genuinely insane, but is a well-mannered and polite gentleman who, despite his wacky hijinks, sets out to always do the right thing in the end. Stanley has brown hair, brown eyes, normal nose, normal ears and wears a blue businessman suit, which he wears to go to the bank in, while The Mask is bald, has cartoonish eyes, a small nose, has ears covered up, which can only be seen when enlarged, and wears his iconic yellow suit, a red tie with black dots on it, with a handkerchief with the same color, a yellow hat with a feather on top of it, and black shoes. Both of them have a complicated relationship with Stanley getting stressed out by The Mask's wackiness and antics, to the point that he throws the mask out on several occasions, but have to get it back when he or the people are in trouble, while The Mask admits that he always wanted to pull a wedgie on Stanley, which he does when they both existed at the same time; but The Mask does truly care about Stanley and helps him with his social life with some success, as he goes after the people who bullied and/or taken advantage of him as the first thing he does, while Stanley does find some of the things he does actually amusing, and eventually ends up caring about The Mask as well, to the point that he no longer hesitates on putting it on. The Mask has even admitted that he wants to teach Stanley how to dance and loves when Stanley ends up using his humor and his antics. The Mask also took Stanley out to see a movie and go out on a surf as well. Though wild and chaotic, The Mask actually proves himself to be a responsible parent figure, as he takes care of Baby Forthright to the point that he forgoes his usual hobbies to look after him, and is very protective of him, as he goes after anyone who tries to harm him. Both Stanley and The Mask care about and love Milo very much like their kid, with Stanley being the responsible, serious father, while The Mask is the laidback, lovable father towards him. It gets to the point that it is one of the few things that they agree on as they go after anyone who hurt Milo or make them hurt him as Pretorius learns the hard way. Stanley and The Mask are neat freaks, showed by keeping the apartment all cleaned up and tidy. The Mask also plays the role of being a childish son towards Peggy, but sometimes play the role of being a brother towards her. The Mask also changes his head into any animals, with his most favourite ones being a dragon, a Sherlock Holmes dog head with a refined accent, and a Tex Avery cartoon wolf. The Mask is lazy and likes to party especially at the Coco Bongo, but he does his job if his friends or the people are in danger, and he is also aware that he is genuinely insane and is very proud of being one, but doesn't like innocent people hurt as he got disturbed by an elf who knew the previous wearers. Both Stanley and The Mask are also one of the few people with common sense as they tend to focus on what is going on unlike most people. Stanley still has the Loaner which is old, sputters and in danger of falling apart, while The Mask has the Maskmobile which is a racing car with orange colours on it with black stripes on it, and a smile on front of it, with Stanley driving slowly with the Loaner, though the Mask drives fast with the Maskmobile, but both of them respect the traffic laws and regulations that goes with it. Stanley is quiet, shy and speaks normally, while The Mask is overdramatic, cheerful, social and speaks loudly, but does know when to keep his voice down to normal levels while still in the apartment. The Mask is very friendly with children as some of them are like him, so when he hears that he robs an orphanage, which he denies it at first, but aware that he is insane, he lets himself be arrested and be sent to prison out of fear that he will do it again and guilt for supposedly doing it, only to find out that it was Pretorius who did it, so he frees himself relived for not actually doing it. The Mask though funny and is a troll, does have his limits as he finds Chronos's time travels too much for him, and does know when to get genuinely serious as he takes Chronos along with those who are capable of hurting him for real far more seriously than he does with most and like Stanley, can become nervous and afraid as he faces off against Walter which he finds out is immune to his wackiness and his antics to the point he becomes genuinely scared of him and sends him somewhere else instead of using his usual methods. The Mask also knows that some things are ridiculous such as after finding out that a cold will kill him and Stanley, he laughs at it first, knowing how silly and ridiculous it sounds, until he finds out just how deadly it can be as one of the symptoms which is loss of bladder control happens and he takes it seriously after it does happen, and takes his face off to save him and Stanley, showing just how smart he really is despite his cartoonish behaviour and nature. The Mask despite being a wild, partying madman, run for mayor after Mayor Tilton (who is actually Pretorius in disguise) starts mismanaging Edge City's budgets, and manages to get up on top at the end, thanks to him being supportive of people's needs and wants, including Mrs Peenman's and became assistant to the President of the United States as well, giving out surprisingly good advice to him as well, showing how brilliant he can be with politics despite preferring to partying about at his favourite nightclub the Coco Bongo. 
 Milo (vocal effects provided by Frank Welker) - Stanley's dog (a Jack Russell Terrier) and loyal sidekick. He is also a frequent wearer of the mask, and is shown to be quite intelligent; able to understand some of the human language. Initially afraid of the Mask because of his unpredictable behavior and wildness, he ends up being more trusting and loyal to him as well. Like his owner, Milo is shy and friendly, while his mask persona is wild and mischievous; yet good-hearted like his owner's alter-ego. Milo's mask persona also changes his appearance due to his cartoonish nature like his owner's alter-ego as well, such as a fireman and also changes his head to an animal, like a sabertooth Tiger and a shark. Milo also keep The Mask in line at times, to the point that The Mask listens to him sometimes.

Supporting characters
 Mitch Kellaway (voiced by Neil Ross) - A cynical and conceited police lieutenant of the Edge City Police Department who is overzealous in blaming the Mask for every big crime and disaster, and linking the Mask to other criminals and villains; for this attention, Kellaway is a frequent victim of atomic wedgies from the Mask. However, overtime, he does start to accept that the Mask is a hero despite his chaotic and wild nature reluctantly. In addition, he is often seen arresting the villains that the Mask apprehends.
 Doyle (voiced by Jim Cummings) - A detective who Kellaway's dimwitted and lazy partner. He is somewhat friendly to the Mask and thinks of him more of a hero than a villain; earning him the Mask's respect. However, despite this, he also falls victim to the Mask's pranks alongside Kellaway.
 Peggy Brandt (voiced by Heidi Shannon) - A tabloid reporter who mends her friendship with Stanley by rescuing him several times after having sold him out to the mob. Her career ambitions often put her in compromising situations from which the Mask rescues her. The Mask has a crush on her, but is content to just being friends with her. She is resourceful in outwitting certain rogues, and shows a motherly affection for the Mask. She can sometimes be a sister-figure to the Mask. She also wears the mask at one point and becomes a British-accented, egotistical and staid woman only interested in her looks, who does care deeply about Stanley, but eventually gives Stanley the tool he needs to take it off after noticing a crooked eyebrow on her. Her normal-self wears blue trousers, blue shirt, brown shoes and a brown coat, along with having a brown hair, while her masked-self wears her normal-self's clothes at first, but changes them to flowery clothes, a flowery hat on top of her head, and blue heel-shoes, while still retaining her brown hair.   
 Charlie Schumacher (voiced by Mark L. Taylor) - The proud and selfish manager of the bank where Stanley works. In stark contrast to how he was portrayed in the film, he usually looks out for himself, pursues women and takes advantage of Stanley while acting as his friend. Although he promises to help Stanley's career, he is unhappy and jealous when Stanley finds success. For this, the Mask also makes him the target of his pranks and wedgies as well, although he does still see him as a friend like Stanley.

Recurring characters
 Arthur Neuman (voiced by Ben Stein) - Stanley's therapist and the only character to be voiced by the same actor from the film. He believes that the "Mask" is the suppressed side of Stanley who wants to be outrageous and impulsive. When he got the chance to wear the mask, he turns into a crazed, but composed and polite super-villain who is still principled and disciplined  and embarks on a rampage, diagnosing anyone who had contact with Stanley and the Mask with "Ipkissia Maskosis", putting them in wedgie straitjackets and denies that he is wearing the mask. He does makes exceptions with a boy's mother, as he just put her in a birdcage instead of doing another wedgie straitjacket on her, and still do his job as he was about to do lobotomy on Charlie, but after the alarm on his watch goes off, he remembers his appointment and decides to put him in a wedgie straitjacket instead of wasting time. He teams up with Pretorius to help him destroy Edge City as a way of stopping "Ipkissa Maskosis", but is stopped by Stanley, who gets the mask back. His normal-self wears brown shoes, a brown jacket, a brown tie and his hair is down-straight. His masked-self wears a yellow jacket, a red bowtie with black dots similar to the Mask's necktie, blue trousers, sneakers and his hair is straight-up. His masked-self also uses a child bicycle, a book and finally a pogo stick to get around places, while also showing cartoonish traits as well, with him bouncing his head on the pavement at several occasions, popping his eyes out on springs, stretches his neck up high and blowing steam out of his ears literally and having planets and stars around his head after being hit on the head by Pretorius. His normal-self is mature and an orderly man, but his masked-self is a childish, excitable man and struggles to keep his orderly nature in check sometimes. His masked-self does show he does have morals as he agrees with everyone else that Pretorius is insane after hearing about his plan from him, but thinking that he and Pretorius are the same and believing that his plan is the only way to get rid of Ipkissa Maskosis, so he frees him by going through protocols and putting him into his custody. His masked-self does show he has a sense of responsibility as he does stay with Pretorius to keep an eye on him and despite his insanity, shows he is not stupid as Stanley tries to trick him by saying he has Ipkissa Maskosis, but his masked-self shows that he is trained not to be fooled by reverse psychology and only laughs at his attempt to do it. He is also sadistic as well, as he decides to kill Stanley with electric wires calling it electric shock therapy while putting out a smile along with it. He also changes his voice from deep to high-pitched that reflects his mood such as being serious and controlled to exciting and cheerful. His masked-self ends up electrifying himself when Milo bites him on his bottoms and tries to kill him with the electric wires, but accidentally gets himself electrified instead and explodes into fireworks, then ends up on the ground and his face goes off his unmasked-self after that. 
 Mortimer Tilton (voiced by Kevin Michael Richardson) - The somewhat egotistical and corrupt mayor of Edge City. Despite Tilton's selfishness, he is a person of genuine gratitude and often thanks the Mask for saving the city and frees him from any legal trouble that he causes. He also defends him from Kellaway as he knows that the Mask is genuinely insane, yet harmless and will admit that he saved him from any villains to Kellaway as well; however, occasionally he does get fed up with the Mask's antics when they get more chaotic than usual. He does put laws to stop the Mask from causing trouble, which at one time, he puts up a law that advices everyone to ignore the Mask which worked too well, as the Mask tried to warn people about a swamp monster, but they continue to ignore him instead, and the Mayor agrees to get rid of that law after the Mask saves the day. He is loosely based on Mitchell Tilton whom is nowhere near corrupt and egotistical from what can be seen of him in the film.
 Smedley (voiced by Cam Clarke) - Tilton's white and nerdy assistant. After the incident with Tilton's vengeful ex-girlfriend, Cookie BaBoom, he most likely quit his job to avoid the insanity.
 Agnes Peenman (voiced by Tress MacNeille) - Stanley's cranky and mean-spirited landlady. Due to her attitude, she is a frequent victim of the Mask's shenanigans as well even when Ipkiss becomes the Mask in his apartment. Though she does have her moments like of being nice to him as she is willing to overlook the rent for a few days, if he went out with her niece and became one of The Mask's supporters when he was running for mayor because of the parking meters being in place showing that even she has her limits with things that are ridiculous, which also shows that she can have common sense sometimes.

Antagonists
 Septimus Pretorius (voiced by Tim Curry) - The primary antagonist of the series. He is a mad scientist who had his own head removed from his body and placed on tiny, spider-like robotic legs, which could attach to a larger android body. (This, and his red optic-like eyes, are likely a reference to The New Batman Adventures version of the Batman villain, Mr Freeze, who similarly became a head moving on robotic legs around the same time as this show was made). His plans revolve around either obtaining or controlling the mask (Pretorius is one of the few characters in the series aware of The Mask's true identity) or increasingly insane and deadly scientific experiments. He ends up wearing the mask in one episode and becomes a green-headed spider monster who still retains his personality and full consciousness like Dorian Tryell from the film. He meets Dr. Arthur Neuman who is sent to him as an appointment, but was wearing the mask that has turned him into a psychotic, delusional madman which Pretorius uses to his advantage into helping him with his plan to destroy Edge City, so he can take photographs of aliens from another planet. 
 Walter - Pretorius' mute, indestructible, and monster-esque goon who is the only person capable of shrugging off The Mask's supernatural powers; this unnatural immunity makes him the only foe The Mask is genuinely fearful of going up against and one of the few The Mask takes seriously. 
 Pretorius' Henchmen (variously voiced by Rob Paulsen and Kevin Michael Richardson) - The unnamed henchmen of Pretorius are seen to wear black and purple outfits. They are often seen carrying out criminal errands to prepare for his criminal plots.
 Lonnie the Shark (voiced by Glenn Shadix) - A biker gang leader who has sharp teeth and a hairdo that resembles a shark's fin.
 Pete (voiced by Charlie Adler) - Lonnie the Shark's skinny and lazy sidekick, who makes an excuse of "feeling pain" on any part of his body in order to ditch the gang's dirty work for his fat companions. The one time it didn't work was in "Convention of Evil" when Lonnie intimidated him into telling the villains about their encounters with the Mask.
 Biff, Muffy, and Brad - The three tough members of Lonnie the Shark's biker gang.
 The Terrible Two - Dak (voiced by Cam Clarke) and Eddie (voiced by Jeff Bennett) are two slow-witted teenaged boys who exposed themselves to radiation with the intention of becoming superheroes. Dak subsequently became "Putty Thing" while Eddie became "Fish Guy". Putty Thing has the looks and the shapeshifting powers of DC villain Clayface, while Fish Guy is completely useless, cannot walk on his own, and as revealed in one episode, can't even swim.  Eddie ends up wearing the mask, and becomes Shark Dude, who is arrogant, evil, and egotistical as he thinks that he can do things a lot better without anyone else, even to the point of leaving Putty Thing behind. He gets the mask removed from him thanks to Putty Thing and Stanley working together to stop him.
 Arthur "Art" Nouveau (voiced by Jim Cummings) – An art forger who threatened to blow up a dynamite factory.
 Skillit (voiced by Jason Marsden in season one, Benny Grant in season two) - A mischievous imp who hails from the Shadowland and can suck the shadows from people, which preserves his youth while aging his victims. Because he appears to be 12 years old, he is often forced to do homework when captured. He is over 4,000 years old and has known everyone good or evil who has ever possessed the mask; he refers to the most evil people in history who have worn the mask as "a bunch of fun guys", but he hates it when the mask is used for good intentions. The Mask meets him and is disturbed by him, when he was finding everyone else's shadows along with his, but decides to play it smart and acts the part of being an idiotic, uncaring man, to not let Skillit know what he's up to, and eventually frees everyone else's shadows, resulting in him losing his powers and abilities which he gets from the Shadowland. Given his design, perpetual youth, and sentient shadow, he seems to be an evil parody of  Peter Pan. 
 Kablamus (voiced by Jim Cummings in a homage to Sterling Holloway) - Joe Blow is a green-haired man who had a chemical accident while experimenting on an unbreakable balloon, and gained the power to blow himself up like a balloon and explode without dying.
 Willamina Bubask (voiced by Conchata Ferrell) - A female criminal whose known crimes were dognapping, grand theft auto and assaulting a police precinct. While Stanley was competing in a chili cook-off, Milo stumbled upon her dog-napping activities, to have dogs taste-test each recipe for Cheap Chucky. She has an unrequited love for the emotionless Walter, who she met in prison.
 Cheap Chucky - A crime partner of Willamina Bubask, who was defeated by Milo and later arrested by the police.
 Don Julovit (voiced by Cam Clarke in a Spanish accent) - The greatest bandit from Lispan. He arrived in Edge City for a crime in which every villain dressed as Santa Claus.
 Dynamite Joe (voiced by Jeff Bennett impersonating Sylvester Stallone) - An explosives expert who disguises himself as Santa Claus for a crime spree.
 Chet Bozzack (voiced by Dan Castellaneta) - Stanley's reformed high school bully whose dark urges are reawakened when he accidentally wears half of the broken mask. This caused Chet to become one half of his Mask form and committed mischief that even Charlie became a victim of. Chet still thinks putting acts on Stanley is still funny such as pulling wedgies on him which he calls Melvins and putting and nailing wood on Stanley’s head that got him expelled from the high school they were at, though he does have standards as he tries to stop his masked self from killing Stanley, while his masked-self is a joking man who has no standards unlike his unmasked self and is actually one of the few enemies The Mask takes very seriously as the Mask decides to go after him instead of going to the Coco Bongo, and both of them fight each other, though the Mask has the upper hand thanks to his experience and the skills he has. When Chet sees things are going too far, he tries to and is able to stop his mask personality from killing Stanley and The Mask. Chet’s masked self gets removed from his unmasked self when Walter removes his face and Chet finally realised what he has done and makes a vow to change himself and Chet apologised to Stanley, although Charlie fires him after Walter got away. 
 Amelia Chronos (voiced by Victoria Carroll) - A mad scientist who builds time-manipulation devices that cause chaos as she seeks world dominance. Like Walter, Chronos is one of the few enemies The Mask takes seriously, mostly because of her increasingly bizarre (even for him) time-altering experiments. She is also one of the few villains that knows that the Mask is Stanley Ipkiss.
 Colonel Beauregard Klaxon (voiced by Jim Cummings) - A southern businessman who dumps nuclear waste under the city stadium, resulting in a swamp monster abducting the city's sports team. His plot was exposed by the Mask who defeated the swamp monster and Klaxon was arrested by Lieutenant Kellaway
 Billy Bob – Klaxon's henchman.
 Cookie Baboom (voiced by Cree Summer) - An exotic dancer who tries to get revenge on the mayor.
 Channel Surfer (voiced by Gary Owens) - A television-loving couch potato turned super-villain with a gliding surfboard who teleports through televisions and can manipulate electricity and television content. He had all of Edge City watch the TV shows he liked in revenge for canceling his favorite show, the critically panned "Pointy Peaks" and trapped the Mask inside the TV world; until Peggy helped the Mask escape through a live broadcast of Channel Surfer's show, and he is defeated when The Mask sucks him into a TV dish and shoots him into space.
 Gorgonzola the Cheese Witch (voiced by Cree Summer) - An ancient villainess, she returns when her amulet is uncovered from a Mesopotamian tomb by Mrs. Peenman's archaeologist niece Jennifer, who becomes possessed by Gorgonzola's spirit. Her powers include the Cheese-Eye (an eye laser that turns anything into cheese) and the shot-Cheddar (an extra-sharp cheddar cheese arrow, that is fired from Gorgonzola's palm) this character was created as the winner of a contest held by Disney Adventures to create a new villain for the series. Gorgonzola returned without a host in "Convention of Evil" where she recaps her encounter with the Mask despite being briefly interrupted by Bub's arrival.
 Sly Eastenegger (voiced by Neil Ross impersonating Sylvester Stallone) - An action star who tries to take revenge upon his critics by detonating a stolen nuclear bomb during the filming of his movie. His revenge plot is thwarted by the Mask and Sly is arrested by Lieutenant Kellaway.
 Director (voiced by Carlos Alazraqui) - An unnamed film director who helps Sly in his plot.
 Phony Frenchman (voiced by Jess Harnell) - A patriotic French terrorist with a bad French accent.
 The Devil (voiced by Jonathan Harris) - First appearing as Bub, he signs a contract to make Stanley a winner without using the mask, but then tries to take him and the mask to Hell as payment. The Mask is able to save them by defeating the Devil in a dance competition. Bub later returned in "Convention of Evil" where he shows up during Gorgonzola's story to the villains and even recalls his encounter with the Mask. Pretorius notes that they will be down in Bub's lair one day as Bub comments that he doesn't see halos in their future.
 The Tempest (voiced by Bud Cort) - Fritz Drizzle is a former weatherman who was struck by lightning and gained weather-control powers which he then used to seek revenge on those who had disrespected him. Tempest later returned in "Convention of Evil" where he recaps his encounter with the Mask to the other villains.
 The Hood (voiced by Jess Harnell) - Lawrence Lorenzo is a criminal wanted for loan sharking, smuggling, jewel heists, and other crimes. In his civilian form, he was hired to be the police chief, but kidnaps the mayor in an attempt to take over Edge City.
 The Stinger (voiced by Stuart Pankin) - Buzz Stingman is a beekeeper who was turned into a bee-human hybrid creature after being severely stung by genetically altered bees. He had the power to control the behavior of bees and hypnotized the entire city into building a giant beehive. He is ultimately stopped by The Mask who removes his stinger and returns him to normal. Stinger later returned in "Convention of Evil" where he recaps his encounter with the Mask to the other villains. During this time, he gets into a fight with Tempest who called him "Bee Boy".
 Madame Suspiria (voiced by Candi Milo) - a carnival gypsy who believes her family's magic created the mask. She gives Stanley a love potion which is accidentally used on Mrs. Peenman and causes several men to fall in love with her. Suspiria siphons some of the mask's powers to gain revenge on Admiral Wombat, but The Mask tricks her into attacking him with magic which returns his powers.
 Andrew Bedwetter (voiced by Jeff Bennett) - A Broadway director who adapts the "Mad Monkey" film series, which would have stopped future installments from being made, and is upstaged by The Mask (who is a fan of the films) in retaliation, causing him to go insane and try to finance his next production through bank robberies in revenge, while hiring several of The Mask's past enemies as his new cast to help carry out his plot. The Mask thwarted his plans and Bedwetter was arrested by Lieutenant Kellaway. He is a parody of Broadway playwright Andrew Lloyd Webber.
 Government Guy (voiced by Frank Welker in normal form, Kevin Michael Richardson in Mask form) - The tyrannical future ruler of 23rd Century Edge City. At some point after a thermonuclear crisis, he found the mask and used it to power the city, while banning all things fun, building an army of robots to enforce his rules. The Mask time-travels to the future after one of his machines ripped his pants, but he joins the resistance in stopping him. Government Guy puts the future mask on to be as powerful as him, but since he has no understanding of the mask's powers as Stanley does (partly due to his banning on creativity), The Mask uses his greater knowledge to defeat him and remove the mask from him. The Mask then had Government Guy fix his pants which one of his robots ruined when it came to the past. He is a parody of Ross Perot.
 Celia N. Airtight - A former researcher at Wrapmaster and founder of Putterware who products turn leftovers into monsters. The Mask thwarted her plans and left her for the police.
 Harold - Airtight's right-hand man.
 Tex Clobber - A bounty hunter hired by Pretorius alongside Baxter Simon to capture The Mask. Tex Clobber is a wilderness hunter that uses normal hunting weapons. He and Baxter have a rivalry as they compete over capturing The Mask, only for both of them to end up being defeated by him and being hunted down.
 Baxter Simon - A bounty hunter that was hired by Pretorius alongside Tex Clobber to capture The Mask. He is a businessman that uses high tech gadgets. He and Tex have a rivalry with each other and they compete over capturing The Mask, only to end up being defeated by him and hunted down. 
 Selina Swint (voiced by Susan Silo) - A smuggler who brought counterfeit money to Edge City, but accidentally switches bags with Stanley. She was defeated by the Mask and arrested by Lieutenant Kellaway.
 Davida Steelmine (voiced by Cree Summer) - Vicky Pratt is a stage magician-turned-thief and a former schoolmate of Stanley who had a crush on her, which she feels the same way as well. She does not like the Mask very much and prefers Stanley over him, unaware that the two are one-and-the same. When they finally catch up with each other, Stanley becomes horrified when he discovers that his old flame has become a criminal and ultimately decides to become the Mask to stop her, stating that "Vicky Pratt is just an illusion and Davida Steelmine is a criminal". The Mask also has a crush on her like Stanley and as usual, went too strong with her, but like Stanley, he also decides to stop her as well, as he is a superhero and she is a criminal that must be stopped. 
 Cybermite (voiced by Jim Cummings) - A living yet obnoxious computer virus (in a form of a fat termite wearing a leather jacket) who grows bigger by eating brain cells and occasionally cracks terrible jokes. He goes inside Milo, thanks to The Mask who unknowingly brought him back to his apartment. The Mask finds out what has happened to Milo as Stanley told him that Milo is sick and he has something to do with it, which The Mask decides to take care of it straightaway. He manages to defeat Cybermite and Milo is cured.
 The Dark Star Trio - A trio of villains who emerge from the first issue of Doyle's favorite comic book; the "Galactic Avenger". They mistake Kellaway for their fictional archenemy and try to kill him, before they are defeated by The Mask. Its members are:
 War Machine (voiced by Jim Cummings) - A robot armed with deadly weapons.
 Dragon Lady (voiced by Kath Soucie) - She can transform into a dragon, fly, and breathe fire.
 Riptide (voiced by Frank Welker) - A punk-like villain with the ability to transform into water.

Other characters
 Francis Forthwright (voiced by Mary McDonald-Lewis) - One of Stanley's neighbors who sometimes tasks Stanley with babysitting her infant son during random moments.
 Baby Forthwright (vocal effects provided by Frank Welker) - Francis' baby who Stanley babysits when his mum goes out on several occasions, and he wears the mask on three occasions. The Mask surprisingly gets genuinely serious when he takes care of him and shows himself to be a stern, but still a fun-loving and caring father figure to him as he does not do his usual hobbies to take care of him.
 Bank President (voiced by Jim Cummings) - The unnamed boss of Stanley and Charlie whose face is off-screen. In the original film, the bank is managed by his son, Mr. Dickey, who has corrupt practices and bullies Stanley on a daily basis. After he became the Mask, his assertive nature comes out and tells Mr. Dickey off
 Evelyn (voiced by Kath Soucie) - A bank accountant who is similar to Stanley in some ways; kind, polite, and friendly, but more shy than Stanley. She and Stanley agree to go on a date, but things don't go as planned, as she panics and accidentally ends up wearing the Mask of Loki, which turns her into a loud, fun-loving, wacky, love-crazy, confident, southern accented woman called Eve, who acts overly affectionate towards Stanley. Eve takes Stanley on a wild ride, and goes to the Coco Bongo, which there she dances around with him, though forgetting that he is not like her, and can't handle her wildness at all, that then ends up with her throwing him through the ceiling, and she decides to control herself after that. Their date soon turns into a battle against Pretorius (who seeks a bride) and ends up getting the mask removed from her face by Stanley, who puts it back on and takes on Pretorius as The Mask, with Evelyn delivering the finishing blow on Pretorius by firing a missile at him, though she can't remember her time wearing the mask. Afterwards, she and Stanley resume their date, only to break up because of their different views on their dogs. Evelyn wears brownish, greenish clothes, brown shoes, has her hair tied up in prom style and wears glasses. Eve wears a red dress with heel shoes of the same color, has her hair in a ponytail, has blue eyeshadows, red lips, earrings on her square ears, jewelry on her wrists and necklace on her throat. Like The Mask, Eve can transform into any different forms such as being a female Rambo and a Viking, along with she also owns and drives her own vehicle called the Evemobile, but also like The Mask, drives inside the Coco Bongo carefully. Eve can be very wild and chaotic like The Mask, as she gives Stanley hard hugs and forceful kisses, but after accidentally putting him through the ceiling after going too all wild with him, she eases off and after controlling herself, gives him light hugs and gentle kisses. Also like The Mask, Eve doesn't like teaming up with anyone who likes to hurt people as she rejects Pretorius twice for trying to hurt Stanley and also for being a madman as well. 
 Ace Ventura - (voiced by Michael Hall) - A Miami-based private pet detective specializing in the retrieval of missing animals who helps Stanley find Milo. He and The Mask initially start out as rivals; due to their over-the-top natures, but eventually start getting along with each other in the end, even if the Mask got irritated by him finding out that he and Stanley are one and the same person(due to Jim Carrey portraying both Ace and Stanley/The Mask.

Parodies of other comics

Villains were often parodies from DC Comics or Marvel Comics  and The Mask due to being a fan of superhero comic books transforms into several forms that are parodies of either DC or Marvel, such as him becoming Supermask and Super Salad Man (a spoof of Superman), or becoming Biclops (a spoof of Cyclops), Spiderhyny (alias Spider-Man), the Green Surfer (alias Silver Surfer) and the Toolverine (a spoof of Wolverine), and a villain that turned into a dinosaur like Sauron. Notable were Skillit (spoof of Mr. Mxyzptlk and Peter Pan, albeit much more malevolent in nature), Buzz Stingman (who was transformed by mutant bees in a similar manner to Swarm) Putty Thing (spoof of the Batman: The Animated Series version of Clayface, portrayed as a dumb teenager rather than an angry, jaded actor), and Davida Steelmine (spoof of Zatanna). In the "Sister Mask" episode, Pretorius hunts meteorites that each give the power of a member of the Fantastic Four.

Episodes

Series overview

Season 1 (1995)

Season 2 (1996–97)

Season 3 (1997)

Crossover

A two-part crossover between The Mask and Ace Ventura: Pet Detective – another animated series based on a Jim Carrey film – aired on August 30, 1997. The crossover begins with The Mask episode "The Aceman Cometh", and concludes with the Ace Ventura episode "Have Mask, Will Travel". At the time of the original airing, Ace Ventura: Pet Detective was running in the adjoining time slot immediately following The Mask in CBS's Saturday morning lineup. During the crossover, Stanley/The Mask and Ace retain their respective animation styles while appearing within the other's show. The crossover also serves as the series finale of The Mask and the second-season finale of Ace Ventura.

In "Have Mask, Will Travel", Stanley catches up to Ace in Miami just as he is recruited to solve a case on a space station, leading Stanley to become The Mask and join the investigation.

Syndication
The series premiered its second season in first-run syndication, mostly on local affiliates, while airing on CBS. It later aired on the Fox Family Channel from 1999 to 2000 (with "Flight as a Feather" removed due to risqué content). Since 2000, it hasn't been seen in the United States. In Australia, it has been rerun sporadically on Boomerang. Cartoon Network aired reruns of the series worldwide, including UK.

Home media

VHS
Six VHS volumes of the series were gradually released from 1995 to 1996, all of which are now out of print.

DVD
Upon the initial DVD release of Son of the Mask, Wal-Mart stores sold an exclusive 2-pack of the movie with the two-part pilot episode of the animated series.

On April 10, 2018, Warner Bros. released the first season on DVD.

The series is also available on iTunes, Amazon Video, YouTube, and Google Play. All episodes are separated into all three seasons and are also featured in an entire collection entitled The Mask: The Complete Series.

Merchandise
Taco Bell distributed toys based on the cartoon for a short period of time in 1997. In South Africa, the Spur franchise used to give out Mask toys with the kiddies burger.

References

External links

Official Website (via Internet Archive)
Rob Paulsen on "Donny & Marie".

The Mask (franchise)
1990s American animated television series
1990s American comic science fiction television series
1990s American superhero comedy television series
1995 American television series debuts
1997 American television series endings
American children's animated action television series
American children's animated adventure television series
American children's animated comic science fiction television series
American children's animated science fantasy television series
American children's animated superhero television series
Television shows based on Dark Horse Comics
Television shows set in Pennsylvania
CBS original programming
First-run syndicated television programs in the United States
Animated television shows based on films
Television series based on adaptations
Television series by New Line Television
Television series by Film Roman
Television series by Sunbow Entertainment
Television series by Warner Bros. Television Studios